is a railway station on the Iida Line in the town of Iijma, Kamiina District Nagano Prefecture, Japan, operated by Central Japan Railway Company (JR Central).

Lines
Ina-Hongō Station is served by the Iida Line and is 155.1 kilometers from the starting point of the line at Toyohashi Station.

Station layout
The station consists of two ground-level opposed side platforms connected by a level crossing. The station is unattended.

Platforms

Adjacent stations

History
Ina-Hongō Station opened on 23 July 1918. With the privatization of Japanese National Railways (JNR) on 1 April 1987, the station came under the control of JR Central. The present station building was completed in 2009.

Passenger statistics
In fiscal 2016, the station was used by an average of 43 passengers daily (boarding passengers only).

Surrounding area
The station is located in a rural area surrounded by orchards.

See also
 List of railway stations in Japan

References

External links

 Ina-Hongō Station information 

Railway stations in Nagano Prefecture
Railway stations in Japan opened in 1918
Stations of Central Japan Railway Company
Iida Line
Iijima, Nagano